Bromsgrove School is a co-educational boarding and day school in the Worcestershire town of Bromsgrove, England. Founded in 1553, it is one of the oldest public schools in Britain, and one of the 14 founding members of the Headmasters' Conference.

Bromsgrove School has both boarding and day students consisting of three schools, pre-prep nursery school (ages 2–7), preparatory school (ages 7–13) and the senior school (13–18). Bromsgrove charges up to £14,055 per term, with three terms per academic year. The school has a total of 200 teaching staff, with 1,660 pupils.

Spread across 100 acres, the main campus is located in the heart of the town of Bromsgrove. However, Bromsgrove School has also expanded overseas, with an additional boarding school in Bangkok (Bromsgrove International School Thailand) and a new school within the Mission Hills complex in Shenzhen, China, Bromsgrove School Mission Hills.

The school's headmaster from September 2022 is Michael Punt, who was previously headmaster of Chigwell School.

History

The school was first recorded in 1476 as a chantry school and was re-established as a grammar school between 1548 and 1553. The 1693 financial endowment of Sir Thomas Cookes, 2nd Baronet (1648-1701) of Norgrove Court in Worcestershire, produced the first buildings on the present site and the historic link with Worcester College, Oxford, which he founded. The arms of Cookes (Argent, two chevronels between six martlets 3, 2 and 1 gules) were adopted by both Worcester College and Bromsgrove School. John Day Collis became head-master in December 1842. The tercentenary of the grammar school was celebrated on 31 March 1853. In 1856 Collis had the chapel and new school rooms built, and existing buildings enlarged and improved. In 1869 Bromsgrove was one of the fourteen founding schools of the Headmasters' Conference.

Second World War 
During the Second World War the entire school was temporarily moved to Llanwrtyd Wells in Wales, as the school buildings were requisitioned by British government departments for the war effort. Many former pupils and members of staff were killed during the Second World War, and their names are commemorated at the war memorial of the town. In 2007, the school was granted the freedom of Llanwrtyd Wells.

Overseas 
In 2002 the school established Bromsgrove International School Thailand (BIST) in Thailand. Then in 2016, the school opened Bromsgrove School Mission Hills, in Shenzhen, China.

Scandals

Financial

In 2005 the school was one of fifty of the country's independent schools which were found guilty of running an illegal price-fixing cartel, exposed by The Times, which had allowed them to drive up fees for thousands of parents. Each school was required to pay a nominal penalty of £10,000 and all agreed to make ex-gratia payments totalling three million pounds into a trust designed to benefit pupils who attended the schools during the period in respect of which fee information was shared.

Abuse
Richard Knight, an Organist and assistant director of music at Bromsgrove School was jailed for two years in 2018 for having sex with two girls from Bromsgrove School on school property, as well as at his own home and inside his car and on the school's USA 2010 Chapel Music Tour.
Judge Jeremy Baker QC, speaking at Worcester Crown Court on Friday, told Knight, 53, the two victims had "particularly vulnerable" emotional backgrounds. "You knew that and that was why they were specifically targeted over and above other children at school", he said.
The judge described Knight's behaviour as "predatory" and that there was a "significant degree of planning".
Mr Knight, previously the conductor of Malvern Festival Chorus, had begun the second affair after the first one ended and taught both pupils at the school. Knight had sex with one of the victims for the first time at her own home while her parents were out during Christmas Eve. The victim would often have to ride her bicycle to various pharmacists to get morning after pills. 
The court also heard evidence that Knight's wife had been a Bromsgrove School pupil, while he was working at the school. They married in 2002.

Commemoration Day 
Commemoration Day (known colloquially as Commem) is the senior school's traditional end of year celebration. It is a special day for the school and especially for the upper sixth leavers. When Sir Thomas Cookes re-endowed the school in 1693, he enjoined that once a year a sermon should be preached to the scholars of the school in St John's Parish Church. It is this that the school commemorates as well as celebrating the end of the academic year with a prizegiving.

Following a very small private ceremony in the Cookes Room celebrating the founder Sir Thomas Cookes where the heads of school lay a wreath beneath a portrait of Cookes, the whole school (except the lower fourth) then proceeds to St John's Church for the commemoration service. Unusually the school does not have its own school song, however, Charles Villiers Stanford's setting of Te Deum Laudamus in B flat has been sung at the service since 1989, becoming an unofficial school song.

After the church service everyone returns to school and takes their place in the speeches' marquee. The school and parents are addressed by the president of the school and the headmaster. Prizes are awarded to upper sixth leavers and other pupils.

At 4.15pm the chapel bell begins to toll, calling the school to final call over. All the pupils line up in houses with their houseparents, housemothers and tutors on the parade ground between Kyteless and the chapel. Each house, beginning with school house (the senior house of the school), in turn then moves forward and every pupil shakes hands with their house staff, the heads of school and then the headmaster and his wife. The final ceremony is the lowering of the school flag by the heads of school who hand it to the deputy head who then hands it to the headmaster for safekeeping until the start of the next academic year.

Students
Bromsgrove School has boarding and day students and consists of three schools, pre-prep nursery school (ages 2–7), preparatory school (ages 7–13) and the senior school (13–18). The school has a total of 200 teaching staff, with 1,660 pupils, including 220 in the pre-preparatory school, 500 in the preparatory School and 940 in the senior school, of whom 60% are male and 40% female, 60% boarding and 40% day. As well as British students, there are more than three hundred from 49 different countries, especially Russia, Germany, China and Hong Kong.

The school website states that the pass rate at grades A* to C (exams at age 16) is 96%. Bromsgrove also started teaching the International Baccalaureate Diploma (IB) in 2009, with sixth form students having the choice between IB, BTEC and A-Levels. The rugby match against King Edward's School, Birmingham, that has been played annually since 1875, is thought to be the oldest continuous rugby fixture between two schools in England.

Heads of school and monitors 

Similar to most public schools in Britain and the Commonwealth, Bromsgrove has a system of school leaders known as monitors. As representatives of the school, monitors' jobs are mostly based around keeping the school running at its best level of quality and tradition, with chapel and lunch duties being an example of this. Pupils who belong to any of these categories, in addition to other leadership roles, are entitled to a certain set of privileges, such as monitor ties, brown shoes, and waistcoats/cardigans.

In addition to the monitors, Bromsgrove has a set of heads of school featuring a head boy and girl, and their respective deputies.

Monitors and heads of school are chosen towards the end of their penultimate lower sixth year; the decision is made from a combination of both a student poll and teacher vote.

Academic results 
57% of Bromsgrove School students achieved A*/A for the 2019 A Levels examination while 64% of students obtained A*/A for the 2019 GCSE examination.

Houses

The preparatory school houses of Boulton (Matthew Boulton), Darby (Abraham Darby), Telford (Thomas Telford), Watt (James Watt), are named after famous British industrialists.

The senior school is divided into thirteen houses; 6 for boys, five for girls and two mixed.

Boarding houses 
Mary Windsor, named after the daughter of Thomas Hickman-Windsor, 1st Earl of Plymouth and his wife Anne Savile, is for girl boarders. In 2012, Mary Windsor was moved into a new building as part of the developments around the south gate.

Oakley House is the largest house, home to both boarding and day girls. It is situated alongside Mary Windsor and Elmshurst, in the newly developed area by the South Gate.

Housman Hall for sixth form girls and boys was opened in 2005, after the school bought the Ramada Perry Hall Hotel for 3 million pounds. The building was formerly the home of A. E. Housman, an old Bromsgrovian, and was expanded in 2009 into the neighbouring building, subsequently renamed Housman. During an exclusive opening ceremony in 2014, Housman Hall was reopened after the school had completed a brand new refurbishment which significantly improved the boarding accommodation.

Wendron Gordon with over 100 pupils in 2009–2010, due to merging with School House, is for boy boarders.

Elmshurst is also for boy boarders and was named after the original house that was located at 17 New Road. Elmshurst was sold in the mid-1970s and the students relocated within the school campus to the current building which was refurbished in 2018. Elmshurst now has an additional annexe known as Webber, which is located by the Conway Road entrance.

Webber House is the newest boarding house at Bromsgrove School, catering to Sixth Form boarders.

Day Houses 
Lupton, named after Lupton House, in Sedbergh School, and Lyttelton, named after the school's links with Baron Lyttelton, a local lord, are houses for day boys, located in the centre of the campus. Walters, named after the school's wartime headmaster, is also a boys' day house.

Thomas Cookes and Hazeldene are two girls' day houses that are situated in the original and oldest building on the school's site.

School House is the senior house of the school, and often considered the most prestigious. After beginning as a boarding house, School is now a boys day house situated in the west wing of the Wendron-Gordon building. It consistently ranks as one of the most academically able houses, winning multiple prizes in academics and debating. It leads the final call over during the end of year Commemoration Day ceremony.

Ottilie Hild is the newest girls' day house, overlooking Gordon Green and opened in September 2020.

School terms 
There are three academic terms in the year.

 The Michaelmas term, from early September to mid December. New pupils are now admitted only at the start of the Michaelmas, unless in exceptional circumstances.
 The Lent term, from early January to late March.
 The Summer term, from late April to late June or early July.

Within each term, there is a break known as a half term, in which all pupils return home.

Headmasters
The headmasters of the school:

Old Bromsgrovians

Notable Old Bromsgrovians, include five Victoria Cross recipients and A. E. Housman. In business and politics, Digby Jones and Michael Heseltine were both educated at Bromsgrove, as were actors Ian Carmichael, Richard Wattis (of Hancock's Half Hour, Sykes, Father Dear Father), Trevor Eve (of Shoestring), Nick Miles (of Emmerdale) and Arthur Darvill (of Doctor Who). The author Nicholas Evans who wrote The Horse Whisperer and journalist Chris Atkins were educated at Bromsgrove. More recently, Iskra Lawrence (an English model, global role model and brand ambassador) attended the School.

In music, John Illsley, of the band Dire Straits, Guillemots member Fyfe Dangerfield, Ritchie Neville of boy band Five and jazz saxophonist Soweto Kinch attended the school.

The school continues to produce leading sportsman – Matt Neal attended during the 1980s, and Andy Goode was part of the drive by the school to welcome more leading rugby players to the school. Bromsgrove continues to educate many England national sportsmen including Ben Foden and Matt Mullan who have played Rugby union for England.

Others include Peter Spence, an English journalist and writer who wrote the British sitcom To the Manor Born and Admiral Sir Ben Key KCB, CBE, ADC, who is a senior naval officer; and has served as First Sea Lord since November 2021.

Rear-Admiral Sir David William Haslam (1923–2009) was educated at Bromsgrove School; he returned as a governor and lived opposite the school in Worcester Road until his death.

Medals for gallantry
Five Old Bromsgrovians are known to have received the Victoria Cross:

Sir George White (1835–1912), Commander-in-Chief, India, 1893–1899, Governor of Gibraltar 1900–1904
Percy Thompson Dean (1877–1939)
Eustace Jotham (1884–1915)
Frank Bernard Wearne (1894–1917)
Nigel Gray Leakey (1913–1941)

One old Bromsgrovian, Oliver Bryson, is known to have received the George Cross,

See also
List of the oldest schools in the United Kingdom

References

External links 
 Bromsgrove School Website
 Bromsgrove School Alumni Website
 Bromsgrove School OB's who died in three wars
 Map of Bromsgrove School Grounds
 Bromsgrove School; Country: Great Britain; For whom: Combined; Payment level: less $20K; Address: UK Worcestershire Worcester Road, Bromsgrove, B61 ...

Educational institutions established in the 1550s
Private schools in Worcestershire
1553 establishments in England
 
Member schools of the Headmasters' and Headmistresses' Conference
Boarding schools in Worcestershire
Bromsgrove
International Baccalaureate schools in England
Worcester College, Oxford